Labrisomus wigginsi, the Baja blenny, is a species of labrisomid blenny endemic to the Pacific coast of Baja California. The specific name honours the collector of the type, the botanist Ira L. Wiggins (1899-1987) of Stanford University.

References

wigginsi
Fish described in 1953
Taxa named by Clark Hubbs